Ghiliceni is a commune in Telenești District, Moldova. It is composed of three villages: Cucioaia, Cucioaia Nouă and Ghiliceni.

Notable people
 Dumitru Dron

References

Communes of Telenești District